Mrs McGinty's Dead is a work of detective fiction by British writer Agatha Christie, first published in the US by Dodd, Mead and Company in February 1952 and in the UK by the Collins Crime Club on 3 March the same year. The US edition retailed at $2.50 and the UK edition nine shillings and sixpence (9/6). The Detective Book Club issued an edition, also in 1952, as Blood Will Tell.

The novel features the characters Hercule Poirot and Ariadne Oliver. The story is a "village mystery", a subgenre of whodunit which Christie usually reserved for Miss Marple. The novel is notable for its wit and comic detail, something that had been little in evidence in the Poirot novels of the 1930s and 1940s. Poirot's misery in the run-down guesthouse, and Mrs Oliver's observations on the life of a detective novelist, provide considerable entertainment in the early part of the novel. The publication of Mrs McGinty's Dead may be considered as marking the start of Poirot's final phase, in which Ariadne Oliver plays a large part. Although she had appeared in Cards on the Table in 1936, Mrs Oliver's most significant appearances in Christie's work begin here. She appears in five of the last nine Christie novels featuring Poirot, and appears on her own without Poirot at all in The Pale Horse (1961).

Plot summary
Superintendent Spence visits Poirot to ask him to find evidence that would forestall the execution of James Bentley, who has recently been convicted of killing his elderly landlady, Mrs McGinty, for a meager £30. All evidence points to his guilt, but something about Bentley's surly acceptance of his fate just doesn't sit right with the experienced Spence. Poirot agrees to go to the village of Broadhinny and investigate the murder. Taking a room in the Summerhayes' guest house, Poirot finds that Mrs McGinty often worked as a charwoman at various village houses. No one wants to talk to Poirot, most being satisfied that Bentley is guilty. 

During the course of his investigations, Poirot discovers that, three days before the murder, Mrs McGinty took a clipping from a notorious Sunday newspaper, containing an article showing photos of females who had disappeared after being involved in decades-old criminal cases. She then wrote to the paper, claiming to have found a photo like one of the women, proving a villager was one of the missing women in disguise. However, her terrible spelling had caused the paper to dismiss her as a simple fame-seeker. Poirot and Spence, using the ages of people in the town, conclude that someone is either Lily Gamboll, who committed murder with a meat cleaver at only 12 years old, or Eva Kane, a governess who had had an affair with her employer, Mr Craig. Craig was later convicted and executed for killing his wife. After being acquitted as an accessory, a pregnant Eva had changed her surname to "Hope" and left the country. Some sources claim she had a child named Evelyn, and several women in the town are the right age to be Evelyn, as well. 

Shortly afterwards, Poirot discovers an old sugar cutter with traces of blood on it in the Summerhayes' house; the house was never locked, and the hammer was easily accessible to anyone. In an attempt to flush out the murderer, Poirot claims to know more than he does, and is nearly pushed under an oncoming train, proving that the guilty party is still at large. Having acquired originals of the photos used in the article, Poirot shows them to the villagers at a gathering at wealthy Mrs Laura Upward's house. Mrs Upward claims to have seen the photo of Lily Gamboll, but refuses to say where.

Later, Poirot is contacted by Maude Williams, who had worked at an estate agent's with Bentley in another town before Bentley was laid off. She refuses to believe he is capable of murder, and offers to help Poirot. He accepts, and gets her to pose as a maid in the house of Mrs Wetherby, one of the houses Mrs McGinty cleaned. Poirot notices that Mrs Weatherby's daughter by her first marriage, Deirdre Henderson, is rather sulky and defeated, much like Bentley. Deirdre is also the only villager who, like Maude, believes in Bentley's innocence.

During the maid's night off, Mrs Upward's spoiled artistic son, playwright Robin Upward, goes to the theatre with famed mystery writer Ariadne Oliver, whose novel he is planning to dramatize. When they return home, they find Mrs Upward strangled to death. She has evidently had coffee with her murderer, and the lipstick on a coffee cup and perfume in the air points to a woman having committed the crime. Mrs Upward had invited three people to her house that night: Eve Carpenter, Deirdre Henderson and Shelagh Rendell. Only Henderson came, but she found the house dark, and left without speaking to anyone. Any of the three women could be someone from the photographs. Additionally, the postmistress's assistant, Edna, saw someone with blonde hair enter the house; Carpenter and Rendell (who both refuse to cooperate with the police) are blonde, but Henderson is brunette. 

A book is discovered in the Upward house with Evelyn Hope's signature written on the flyleaf, suggesting Mrs Upward was actually Eva Kane, further confusing the situation. Poirot then finds a photo in a drawer in the Summerhayes' house, and realizes it must be the photo Mrs McGinty saw. It is of Eva Kane, and has the inscription "my mother" on the back. Recognizing the handwriting, Poirot gathers the suspects together and abruptly accuses Robin Upward of the murders, startling him into a confession.

Robin Upward is Eva Kane's son, Evelyn Hope (at the time, the name Evelyn was still often given to male children); the real Robin Upward had died young, while Mrs Upward lived elsewhere. Too proud to be pitied as a childless widow, Mrs Upward took in impoverished young men to take Robin's place, although she treated them more as a patron would a protégé, and dropped them if they turned out less than satisfactory. Evelyn Hope had been the most successful "son", and had been living with her at the time she moved to Broadhinny; he was assumed by most to really be her son Robin, although Mrs Summerhayes, herself an adopted child, deduced the truth. Mrs McGinty found the photo of Eva Kane while working at the Upward house, and assumed the photo was of Mrs Upward as a young woman. 

Evelyn/Robin, realizing that any scandal would put an end to his use of Mrs Upward's money, stole the sugar cutter and killed Mrs McGinty before she could tell too many people of her "discovery". He framed Bentley by stealing the £30, correctly assuming Bentley would panic and incriminate himself. The night of the party, Mrs Upward had recognized Eva Kane's photo as that of Evelyn/Robin's mother, whose backstory Evelyn/Robin had falsified to her. She wanted to confront Evelyn/Robin by herself, so she pointed to the photo of Lily Gamboll to put Poirot off the scent. 

Evelyn/Robin however, suspected the truth; pretending to forget something the night of the play, he left Mrs Oliver waiting in the car and went back inside, killing Mrs Upward to inherit her money. He planted the evidence, and made the three calls in a disguised voice, to make it appear as if a woman had committed the crime. He later planted the photo at Mrs Summerhayes' house to incriminate her. However, Poirot had gone through the drawer a short time earlier, and the photo had not been in it then; it had been put in afterwards, and only Evelyn/Robin had been free to do so at the time in question.

Further revelations are also made. Eve Carpenter wanted to conceal her true roots from her aristocratic husband, which was why she would not co-operate in the investigation. Spence discovers that Shelagh Rendell has been receiving poison pen letters claiming her husband Dr Rendell murdered his first wife. Poirot heavily suspects that it was Dr Rendell, and not Evelyn Hope, who tried to push him under the oncoming train, afraid of the old scandal being raked up. Maude Williams turns out to be Maude Craig; despite the jury deciding otherwise, both Maude and the police are convinced her mother Mrs Craig was actually murdered by Eva Kane, and that Mr Craig, having got Eva pregnant, chivalrously took the blame. Maude was the blonde who came to see Mrs Upward, as she had been trying to trace Eva Kane through Evelyn, whose true identity Maude knew. However, Maude found Mrs Upward's body, realized she might be accused of murder, and left quietly. She admits this to Poirot, who agrees to keep it a secret and wishes her good luck in her life. 

Deirdre Henderson is revealed to have been mistreated by her stepfather and forced to care for her hypochondriac mother (who pretends to be an invalid) because Deirdre has money of her own, left to her by her father, that they do not want to lose the use of. She also has some romantic feelings for Bentley, and he for her. Bentley is freed, though he is still too bewildered and sulky over events to show proper gratitude. However, Spence is convinced they have closed the case at last, much to Poirot's relief.

Characters
 Hercule Poirot - Famous Belgian detective asked to reinvestigate the case.
 Ariadne Oliver - Novelist and old acquaintance of Poirot who is working with Robin Upward on a play.
 Superintendent Spence - An old friend of Poirot's who asks him to look into the case.
 James Gordon Bentley - Former lodger of Mrs McGinty wrongly convicted of her murder
 Mr Scuttle - James Bentley's former employer.
 Maude Williams - A former co-worker of James Bentley. In reality, Maude Craig, making use of her connection to try and track down Eva Kane.
 Maureen Summerhayes - The inept owner of the Broadhinny guest house Long Meadows. She is adopted and is briefly suspected of being Evelyn Hope.
 Major Johnnie Summerhayes - Maureen's husband. He feels obliged to stay in Broadhinny because of his family history even though he has no skill at farming. He has a temper which causes Robin to attempt to frame him as the murderer.
 Guy Carpenter - A businessman with an interest in politics.
 Eve Carpenter - The new wife of Guy Carpenter, formerly an employer of Mrs McGinty as Mrs Selkirk. She pretended to be a widow when she moved to Broadhinny but had never married before.
 Robin Upward - Playwright working with Ariadne Oliver. He is really Evelyn Hope, son of Eva Kane, and murders both Mrs McGinty and his adopted mother Laura to stop it being revealed.
 Laura Upward - Adopted mother of Robin Upward, who she gave the name of her deceased biological son. She is initially unaware of his past.
 Dr Rendell - Local doctor of Broadhinny, suspected of having murdered his first wife. Poirot believes it was he who tried to kill him by pushing him in front of a train.
 Sheelagh Rendell - Second wife of Dr Rendell who fears Poirot is investigating her husband.
 Mr Roger Wetherby - Overbearing stepfather of Deirdre Henderson who relies on her to keep house while taking advantage of her inheritance.
 Mrs Edith Wetherby - Mother of Deirdre Henderson. She exaggerates her infirmity to force Deirdre to stay and look after her.
 Deirdre Henderson - Daughter of Edith Wetherby and stepdaughter of Roger. She is fond of James Bentley and Poirot intends to matchmake between them at the novel's conclusion.
 Bessie Burch - Mrs McGinty's niece.
 Joe Burch - Bessie's husband
 Lily Gamboll - Mentioned in Sunday Comet article as having killed her aunt aged twelve. Suspected of living in Broadhinny.
 Mrs McGinty - Charwoman for the Rendells, Upwards, Wetherbys and Carpenters, murdered because she discovered a photo of Eva Kane at the Upward house.
 Pamela Horsefall - Editor of the Sunday Comet who Mrs McGinty contacted about the tragic women article.
 Michael West - Actor who is acquainted with Robin Upward and knows of his adoption.
 Mrs Elliott - Next door neighbour of Mrs McGinty who discovered her body.
 Constable Albert "Bert" Hayling - Village constable of Broadhinny.

Explanation of the title
The novel is named after a children's game – a sort of follow-the-leader type of verse somewhat like the Hokey-Cokey — that is explained in the course of the novel.

Literary significance and reception
Maurice Richardson of The Observer  of 23 March 1952 thought that Poirot was "slightly subdued" and summed up "Not one of A.C's best-constructed jobs, yet far more readable than most other people's."

Robert Barnard: "This village murder begins among the rural proletariat (cf. Death by Drowning in The Thirteen Problems and the excellent London working-class woman in The Hollow), but after a time it moves toward the better-spoken classes. Poirot suffers in a vividly awful country guesthouse in order to get in with the community and rescue a rather unsatisfactory young man from the gallows. Highly ingenious – at this point she is still able to vary the tricks she plays, not repeat them."

References to other works
 When Superintendent Spence arrives to see Poirot, the detective reacts to him as though it has been many years since the case on which they worked. The case in question was, however, the one retold in Taken at the Flood, which is the previous novel in the series, and was explicitly set in 1946. At most, it can only have been six years since they last worked together. Of course, chronologies are difficult to construct, especially with Poirot's career.
 Poirot refers in the first chapter to a case in which the resemblance between his client and a soap manufacturer proved significant. This is the case of "The Nemean Lion", first published in the Strand Magazine in November 1939 and later collected in The Labours of Hercules (1947).
 Mrs Oliver, who is a very amiable caricature of Dame Agatha herself, remarks about her gaffes in her books. In chapter 12, she mentions one of her novels (actually a thinly veiled reference to Christie's own Death in the Clouds) in which she had made a blowpipe one foot long, instead of six.
 "Evelyn Hope” is the name of a poem by Robert Browning that is quoted in the course of the novel. In Taken at the Flood Christie had made a character take the alias of "Enoch Arden", which is a poem by Tennyson.

Adaptations

Film

The novel was adapted by MGM in 1964 as the film Murder Most Foul. However, in an unusual move, the character of Poirot was replaced with Miss Marple (portrayed by Margaret Rutherford), who comes onto the case when she is a juror in the trial of the lodger who is accused of the murder. She is the only juror to believe the lodger is innocent and will not join with the others to vote guilty. The jury foreman says to the judge that they cannot make up their minds. The judge rules for a mistrial and arranges for a retrial in a week, giving Miss Marple seven days to solve the case.

However, the film is otherwise only loosely based on the novel, altering almost all the characters, subplots, names, and deaths.  The motive for the murder remains the same, but the killer's name and role are changed from that of the novel.  The film's tone is more playful and light-hearted than the novel, as was characteristic of Rutherford's Christie film adaptations.

Television

British adaptation
A television programme was produced in 2007 with David Suchet as Poirot in the ITV series Agatha Christie's Poirot, first broadcast on 14 September 2008. It was directed by Ashley Pearce, who also directed Appointment with Death and Three Act Tragedy for the ITV series. It also starred Zoë Wanamaker returning as Ariadne Oliver (who first appeared in Cards on the Table) and Richard Hope as Superintendent Spence (who first appeared in Taken at the Flood), respectively. The adaptation is reasonably faithful to the novel, with the deletion of a few characters and omitting two of the women from the newspaper article – only focusing on Lily Gamboll and Eva Kane. 

The characters of Deirdre Henderson and Maude Williams are merged in the film. As such it is Maude Williams, the estate agents' secretary (with dark hair instead of blonde), who is in love with Bentley and helps Poirot throughout his investigation. Maude and Bentley are reunited by Poirot in the final scene. Also, Dr Rendall's secret is not that he is suspected of killing his first  wife, but of mercy killing terminally ill patients. It is Mrs Rendall, rather than her husband, who makes an attempt on Poirot's life.

French adaptation
The novel was adapted as a 2015 episode of the French television series Les Petits Meurtres d'Agatha Christie.

Radio
Mrs McGinty's Dead was adapted for radio by Michael Bakewell for BBC Radio 4 in 2006, featuring John Moffatt as Poirot.

Publication history 

 1952, Dodd Mead and Company (New York), February 1952, Hardback, 243 pp
 1952, Collins Crime Club (London), 3 March 1952, Hardback, 192 pp
 1952, Walter J. Black (Detective Book Club), 180 pp (Dated 1951)
 1953, Pocket Books (New York), Paperback, 181 pp
 1957, Fontana Books (Imprint of HarperCollins), Paperback, 188 pp
 1970, Pan Books, Paperback, 191 pp
 1988, Ulverscroft Large-print Edition, Hardcover, 
 2008, HarperCollins; Facsimile edition, Hardcover, 

In the US, the novel was serialised in the Chicago Tribune in its Sunday edition in thirteen parts from 7 October to 30 December 1951 under the title of Blood Will Tell.

References

External links
Mrs McGinty's Dead at the official Agatha Christie website

1952 British novels
Hercule Poirot novels
Works originally published in the Chicago Tribune
Novels first published in serial form
Dodd, Mead & Co. books
British novels adapted into films
British novels adapted into television shows